Federal Polytechnic, Ede is a Nigerian tertiary institution that was established in 1992. It is located in Ede, a town in Osun State, southwestern Nigeria. It is a National Diploma and Higher National Diploma awarding institution.

Courses offered

References

Osun State
Federal polytechnics in Nigeria
Educational institutions established in 1992
1992 establishments in Nigeria